Michael Allen Andrews (born February 7, 1944) is an American attorney and politician who served as a member of the United States House of Representatives from Texas. He was elected as a Democrat to the 98th United States Congress and the five succeeding Congresses. He served from January 3, 1983, until January 3, 1995.

Early life and education 
Born in Houston, Andrews graduated from Arlington Heights High School in Fort Worth, Texas in 1962. In 1967, he earned a Bachelor of Arts degree from the University of Texas at Austin. In 1970, he earned a Juris Doctor from the Dedman School of Law.

Career 
He was admitted to the Texas bar in 1971, and he worked as a lawyer in private practice. From 1971 to 1972, he was a law clerk for the United States district court judge for the Southern District of Texas. From 1972 to 1976, he was the assistant district attorney for Harris County, Texas. He continued private practice of law from 1976 until 1983.

Congress 
In 1982, Andrews ran for the neighboring 25th district, which had been carved out of most of the more Democratic portions of the old 22nd. He won there easily and was reelected five more times. He even ran unopposed in 1986 and 1990.

He was not a candidate for renomination in 1994, choosing instead to run for the Democratic nomination in the 1994 United States Senate election.

Later career 
He is senior counsel for the Washington, D.C. branch of King & Spalding.

References

External links
Michael Allen Andrews entry at The Political Graveyard

1944 births
Living people
Politicians from Houston
Politicians from Fort Worth, Texas
Dedman School of Law alumni
Texas lawyers
University of Texas at Austin alumni
Democratic Party members of the United States House of Representatives from Texas

Members of Congress who became lobbyists